The Fort Mill Ridge Civil War Trenches are battle trenches in West Virginia that were originally dug between 1861 and 1862 to be later used in 1863 for the civil war. These trenches lined with chestnut logs by the Confederate artillery during the American Civil War to defend the approaches to Romney on the Northwestern Turnpike and the South Branch Potomac River. The trenches were then refurbished between March and June 1863 by the 54th Pennsylvania Infantry and the 1st West Virginia Infantry. When Colonel Jacob M. Campbell (54th PVI) garrisoned Union forces at Romney, camps were set up at nearby at Mechanicsburg Gap. The Confederates might have created these trenches but all throughout the war the Union had control of these trenches.

The Fort Mill Ridge trenches are believed to be the best preserved battle trenches dating from the Civil War in existence. The trenches are located three miles southwest of Romney adjacent to the Fort Mill Ridge Wildlife Management Area off of the Northwestern Turnpike (U.S. Route 50/West Virginia Route 28).

A Civil War museum relating to the construction and use of the Fort Mill Ridge trenches is located within the Taggart Hall Civil War Museum & Visitors Center on the corner of High Street and Gravel Lane in downtown Romney.

This place is significant not only because of battle that was being taken place but for the military and engineering. The engineering style the Confederates used is an excellent example of a rammed earth fortification" to protect the transportation routes as well. Also, this brought a new age to wars and a new fighting style of fighting in trenches rather than an open field. It provided more protection and defense than the offensive strategy of fighting. The defensive method was used so the transports can pass by safely.

It was listed on the National Register of Historic Places in 2014.

See also
List of historic sites in Hampshire County, West Virginia

References

External links

Military facilities on the National Register of Historic Places in West Virginia
Miller
Miller
Hampshire County, West Virginia, in the American Civil War
Open-air museums in West Virginia
Tourist attractions in Hampshire County, West Virginia
National Register of Historic Places in Hampshire County, West Virginia
1861 establishments in Virginia
American Civil War on the National Register of Historic Places
American Civil War sites in West Virginia